The Republic of India has two principal short names, each of which is historically significant, "India" and "Bharata".  A third name, "Hindustān", is sometimes an alternative name for the region comprising most of the modern Indian states of the Indian Subcontinent when Indians speak among themselves. The usage of "Bhārat", "Hindustān", or "India" depends on the context and language of conversation.

"Bhārat", the name for India in several Indian languages, is variously said to be derived from the name of either, King Dushyanta's son Bharata or Rishabha's son Bharata. At first the name Bhārat referred only to the western part of the Gangetic Valley, but was later more broadly applied to the Indian subcontinent and the region of Greater India, as was the name "India". Today it refers to the contemporary Republic of India located therein. The name "India" is originally derived from the name of the river Sindhu (Indus River) and has been in use in Greek since Herodotus (5th century BCE). The term appeared in Old English as early the 9th century and reemerged in Modern English in the 17th century.

India 

 

The English term is from Greek Ἰνδική / Indikē (cf.

The name derives ultimately from Sanskrit , which was the name of the Indus River as well as the lower Indus basin (modern Sindh, in Pakistan). Darius I conquered Sindh in about 516 BCE, upon which the Persian equivalent  was used for the province at the lower Indus basin. Scylax of Caryanda who explored the Indus river for the Persian emperor probably took over the Persian name and passed it into Greek. The terms  for the Indus river as well as "an Indian" are found in Herodotus's Geography. The loss of the aspirate /h/ was probably due to the dialects of Greek spoken in Asia Minor. Herodotus also generalised the term "Indian" from the people of lower Indus basin, to all the people living to the east of Persia, even though he had no knowledge of the geography of the land.

By the time of Alexander,  in Koine Greek denoted the region beyond the Indus. Alexander's companions were aware of at least India up to the Ganges delta (Gangaridai). Later, Megasthenes included in India the southern peninsula as well.

Latin  is used by Lucian (2nd century CE).  was known in Old English language and was used in King Alfred's translation of Paulus Orosius. The name "India" then came back to English usage from the 17th century onward, and may be due to the influence of Latin, or Spanish or Portuguese.

Sanskrit indu "drop (of Soma)", also a term for the Moon, is unrelated, but has sometimes been erroneously connected.

Hind / Hindustān 

The words  and  came from Indo-Aryan/Sanskrit  (the Indus River or its region). The name was also known as far as the Achaemenid province of Egypt where it was written  on the Statue of Darius I, circa 500 BCE.

In middle Persian, probably from the first century CE, the suffix  was added, indicative of a country or region, forming the  name . Thus, Sindh was referred to as Hindūstān in the Naqsh-e-Rustam inscription of Sassanid emperor Shapur I in  262 CE.

Emperor Babur of the Mughal Empire said, "On the East, the South, and the West it is bounded by the Great Ocean." Hind was notably adapted in the Arabic language as the definitive form  for India, e.g. in the 11th century Tarikh Al-Hind ('History of India').

Both the names were current in Persian and Arabic from the 11th century Islamic conquests: the rulers in the Delhi Sultanate and Mughal periods called their Indian dominion, centered around Delhi, "Hindustan". In contemporary Persian and Urdu language, the term Hindustan has recently come to mean the Republic of India. The same is the case with Arabic, where  is the name for the Republic of India.

"Hindustan", as the term Hindu itself, entered the English language in the 17th century. In the 19th century, the term as used in English referred to the Subcontinent. "Hindustan" was in use simultaneously with "India" during the British Raj.

Bhārata 

Bhārata was selected as an alternative name of India in 1950.

The name Bhārata or Bhārata-varṣa (Bharata-varsha) is said to be derived from the name of  thithankar Rishabhanath's son Bharata. Several Puranas state that it is derived from the name of Bharata, the son of Rishabha.  Some other Puranic passages refer to the Bharata people, who are described as the descendants of Dushyanta's son Bharata in the Mahabharata.

The earliest recorded use of Bhāratavarṣa in a geographical sense is in the Hathigumpha inscription of King Kharavela (first century BCE), where it applies only to a restrained area of northern India, namely the part of the Ganges west of Magadha. In the Sanskrit epic, the Mahabharata (200 BCE to 300 CE), a larger region of North India is encompassed by the term, but much of the Deccan and South India are still excluded.

Bhārata has been used as a self-ascribed name by some people of the Indian subcontinent and the Republic of India. The designation Bhārata appears in the official Sanskrit name of the country, Bhārata Gaṇarājya. The name is derived from the ancient Hindu Puranas, which refer to the land that comprises India as Bhāratavarṣa and uses this term to distinguish it from other varṣas or continents. For example, the Vayu Purana says "he who conquers the whole of Bhāratavarṣa is celebrated as a samrāt (Vayu Purana 45, 86)."

The Sanskrit word bhārata is a vṛddhi derivation of Bharata, which was originally an epithet of Agni. The term is a verbal noun of the Sanskrit root bhr-, "to bear/to carry", with a literal meaning of to be maintained (of fire). The root bhr is cognate with the English verb to bear and Latin ferō. This term also means "one who is engaged in search for knowledge". Barato, the Esperanto name for India, is also a derivation of Bhārata.

According to the Puranas, this country is known as Bharatavarsha after Bharata, the son of Rishabha.He was a Kshatriya born in Ikshvaku Dynasty(Solar Dynasty).(Reference -Champat Rai Jain 1929, p. 92). This has been mentioned in Vishnu Purana (2,1,31), Vayu Purana (33,52), Linga Purana (1,47,23), Brahmanda Purana (14,5,62), Agni Purana (107,11–12), Skanda Purana, Khanda (37,57) and Markandaya Purana (50,41), all using the designation Bharata Varsha.

Vishnu Purāna mentions:

Rishabha was born to Marudevi, Bharata was born to Rishabha,
Bharatavarsha (India) arose from Bharata and Sumati arose from Bharata.
—Vishnu Purana (2,1,31)

This country is known as Bharatavarsha since the times the father entrusted the kingdom to the son Bharata and he himself went to the forest for ascetic practices.
—Vishnu Purana (2,1,32)

 "The country (varṣam) that lies north of the ocean and south of the snowy mountains is called Bhāratam; there dwell the descendants of Bharata."
—Vishnu Purana

The Srimad Bhagavat Purana mentions(Canto 5, Chapter 4) - "He (Rishabha) begot a hundred sons that were exactly like him... He (Bharata) had the best qualities and it was because of him that this land by the people is called Bhârata-varsha"

The Bhāratas were also a Vedic tribe mentioned in the Rigveda, notably participating in the Battle of the Ten Kings.

The realm of Bharata is known as Bharātavarṣa in the Mahabharata (the core portion of which is itself known as Bhārata) and later texts. According to the text, the term Bharata is from the king Bharata, who was the son of Dushyanta and Shakuntala and the term varsa means a division of the earth or a continent.

Bharata Khanda (or Bharata Ksetra) is a term used in Hindu texts, including the Vedas, Mahabharata, Ramayana and the Puranic, to describe the geographic region that encompassed the modern countries of: Afghanistan, Bangladesh, India, Pakistan, Nepal, Bhutan, Maldives, Sri Lanka and Myanmar—that is, South Asia at the term's furthest extent.

Jambudvīpa 

Jambudvīpa was used in ancient scriptures as a name of India before Bhārata became the official name. The derivative Jambu Dwipa was the historical term for India in many Southeast Asian countries before the introduction of the English word "India". This alternate name is still used occasionally in Thailand, Malaysia, Java and Bali to describe the Indian Subcontinent. However, it also can refer to the whole continent of Asia.

Gyagar and Phagyul 

Both, Gyagar and Phagyul, are Tibetan names for India. Ancient Tibetan Buddhist authors and pilgrims used the ethnogeographic referents Gyagar or Gyagar to the south and Madhyadesa (central land or holy centre) for India. Since at least 13th century, several influential indigenous Tibetan  lamas & authors also started to refer to India as the Phagyul, short for Phags yul, meaning the land of aryas i.e. land of noble, holy, enlightened & superior people who are the source of spiritual enlightenment. Tibetan scholar Gendun Chopel explains that tibetan word gyagar comes from the Indian sanskrit language word vihāra (buddhist monastery), and the ancient tibetans applied the term Geysar mainly to the northern and central India region from Kuru (modern Haryana) to Magadha (modern Bihar). The Epic of King Gesar, which originally developed around 200 BCE or 300 BCE and about 600 CE, describes India as the "Gyagar: The Kingdom of Buddhist Doctrine", "Gyagar: The Kingdom of Aru Medicine" (ayurveda), "Gyagar: The Kingdom of Pearls" and  "Gyagar: The Kingdom of Golden Vases". The Central Tibetan Administration, often referred to as the Tibetan Government-in-Exile, asserts "Tibet is inextricably linked to India through geography, history, culture, and spiritually, Tibetans refer to India as ‘Gyagar Phagpay Yul’ or ‘India the land of Aryas.’" Dalai Lama reveres India as the guru with Tibet as its chela (shishya or disciple) and "refers to himself the ‘Son of India’ and a true follower of Mahatma Gandhi. He continues to advocate the revival of India’s ancient wisdom based on the Nalanda tradition."

Tianzhu

A detailed account of Tianzhu is given in the "Xiyu Zhuan" (Record of the Western Regions) in the Hou Hanshu compiled by Fan Ye (398–445):

The term is also used in Japan, where it is pronounced as Tenjiku. The current Japanese name for modern India is the foreign loanword .

Similar to Hindu and Sindhu, the term  印 was used in classical Chinese much like the English Ind.

Hodu
Hodu ( Hodû) is the Biblical Hebrew name for India mentioned in the Book of Esther part of the Jewish Tanakh and Christian Old Testament. In Esther, 1:1 and 8:9,  Ahasuerus had been described as King ruling 127 provinces from Hodu (India) to Ethiopia. The term seemingly derives from Sanskrit Sindhu, "great river", i.e., the Indus River, via Old Persian Hiñd°u. It is thus cognate with the term India.

Historical definitions of India
Some historical definitions prior to 1500 are presented below.

Historical definitions of a Greater India
Writers throughout history, both Indian and of other nationalities have written about a 'Greater India', which Indians have called either Akhand Bharat or Mahabharata.

Republic of India 

The official names as set down in article 1 of the Indian constitution are:
 Hindi: 
 English: India

See also 
 

 Official names of India
 History of India
 Origin of the names of Indian states
 List of regions of India
 Sindhu
 Indosphere
 Bharata Khanda
 Greater India
 Sapta Sindhu
 Bharat Mata
 Bharata chakravartin
 Akhand Bharat

Notes

References

Bibliography

Further reading 
 

Toponyms for India
India
Cultural history of India
History of Pakistan
Indian culture
India
India